Mohamed El Yazghi (born 1 January 1939) is a Moroccan politician and former head of the Socialist Union of Popular Forces party. He was born in Fes, Morocco, and holds the position of minister of state in the current government.

See also
Socialist Union of Popular Forces

References

People from Fez, Morocco
Living people
Socialist Union of Popular Forces politicians
Government ministers of Morocco
1939 births
20th-century Moroccan lawyers